Tapasi Mondal  (born 1 March 1972) is an Indian politician and member of the West Bengal Legislative Assembly representing Haldia constituency from 2016. She was elected as a Communist Party of India (Marxist) member, but later in 2020 joined the Bharatiya Janata Party.

Personal life 
Mondal is married to Arjun Kumar Mondal and is a resident of Durgachak town in the district of Purba Medinipur, West Bengal. She received her education at the Sutahata Labanyaprava Balika Vidyalya.

Political career 
In the 2016 West Bengal Legislative Assembly election, Tapasi Mondal was nominated to contest as the candidate of the Left Front coalition in West Bengal from the Haldia constituency of Purba Medinipur district. Her primary opponent in the election was Madhurima Mandal who was the candidate of the Trinamool Congress. The election resulted in Tapasi Mondal emerging as the winning candidate with a margin of over 21,000 votes and polling at 50.17% of the votes cast against 39.53% of the votes cast in favor of Madhurima Mandal. In December 2020, she was expelled from her party after she declared that she intended to join the Bharatiya Janata Party along with a number of Trinamool Congress legislators.

References

1972 births
Living people
West Bengal politicians
Women in West Bengal politics
Communist Party of India (Marxist) politicians from West Bengal
Bharatiya Janata Party politicians from West Bengal
West Bengal MLAs 2021–2026
21st-century Indian women politicians